Flowers of Evil is the twelfth studio album by Norwegian experimental electronica band Ulver. Written and produced by Ulver, the album was released on August 28, 2020 via House of Mythology. The album was recorded in Oslo from summer 2019 to winter 2020 and mixed by Martin Glover and Michael Rendall in February 2020. The album was officially announced in February 2020 with music video of the song "Russian Doll" being released on Valentine's Day. The second single "Little Boy" was made available on April 4, 2020.

The album cover features a still image of actress Renée Jeanne Falconetti having her head shaved during her performance in the titular role of Carl Theodor Dreyer’s La Passion de Jeanne d’Arc, a film released in 1928.

Track listing

Personnel
Ulver
Kristoffer Rygg – vocals, additional programming
Tore Ylvisaker – keyboards, programming
Ole Alexander Halstensgård – electronics
Jørn H. Sværen – miscellaneous

Additional musicians
Ivar Thormodsæter – drums
Anders Møller – percussion
Christian Fennesz – guitar, electronics (track 1)
Ole Henrik Moe – viola, cello (tracks 2, 6, 8)
Kari Rønnekleiv – violin (tracks 2, 8)
John Stark – bass (tracks 1, 8)
Suzanne Sumbundu – vocals (tracks 3, 7)
Mimmi Tamba – vocals (tracks 3, 7)
Stian Westerhus – guitar (tracks 2–4, 6, 8)
Michael J. York – bagpipes (track 6)

References

2020 albums
Ulver albums